The Bay is an ITV crime drama series produced by Tall Story Pictures and distributed worldwide by ITV Studios Global Entertainment that first aired in March 2019. The first two series starred Morven Christie as a detective sergeant family liaison officer. Marsha Thomason took over the leading role from series three as DS Jenn Townsend. The first series centred around an investigation into teenage missing twins from a family living in Morecambe. The name of the series derives from Morecambe Bay, which is on the north-west coast of England in the county of Lancashire.

The first series received an average of 7.2 million views across the six episodes. A second series of six episodes was confirmed on 4 May 2019 and it was originally planned for it to be broadcast in mid-2020 but due to the COVID-19 pandemic, it was pushed back to early 2021 when in January of that year all six episodes were immediately made available on the ITV Hub, receiving an average of 7.9 million views.

A third series was filmed in the summer 2021. Christie decided to leave the show following production on the second series and Marsha Thomason was cast as the new lead, DS Jenn Townsend. After the last episode of series 3 was broadcast it was announced that a fourth series was forthcoming and in June 2022 that filming was complete.

Cast
 Morven Christie as DS/DC Lisa Armstrong (Series 1–2)
 Marsha Thomason as DS Jenn Townsend (Series 3—present)
 Daniel Ryan as DI Anthony 'Tony' Manning
 Erin Shanagher as Sgt./DS Karen Hobson
 Andrew Dowbiggin as DS James Clarke
 Simon Manyonda as DS Alexander Stewart (Series 1–2)
 Thomas Law as DC Eddie Martin (Series 2—present)
 Taheen Modak as DC/DS Ahmed 'Med' Kharim (Series 1–2)
 Lindsey Coulson as Penny Armstrong (Series 1–2)
 Imogen King as Abbie Armstrong (Series 1–2)
 Art Parkinson as Rob Armstrong (Series 1–2)
 Barry Sloane as Chris Fischer (Series 3-present)
 Georgina Scholes as Erin Fischer (Series 3-present)

Series 1 (2019)
Jonas Armstrong as Sean Meredith
Matthew McNulty as Nick Mooney
Chanel Cresswell as Jess Meredith
Tracie Bennett as Margaret Foley
Adam Long as Vincent Chapman/Victor Cook
Philip Hill-Pearson as Ryan Foley
Martina Laird as Bernie Ward
Richard Huw as Tom Hayes
Jordan Mifsúd as Krzysztof Babakowski
Ellie Duckles as Hanna Babakowski
Ciaran Griffiths as Lee Ward
Louis Greatorex as Sam Hesketh
Roger Barclay as Councillor Hesketh
Darci Shaw as Holly Meredith
Noah Valentine as Dylan Meredith
Lucy Hillyard as Kelly Meredith
Liam McCheyne as Jake Meredith

Series 2 (2021)

Joe Absolom as Andy Warren
James Cosmo as Bill Bradwell
Stephen Tompkinson as Stephen Marshbrook
Sharon Small as Rose Marshbrook
Amy James-Kelly as Grace Marshbrook
Jack Archer as Jamie Marshbrook
Steven Robertson as Mark Bradwell
Sunetra Sarker as Stella Bradwell
Steven Elder as DCI Pearson
Adam Hussain as Josh Nubhai
Arian Nik as Theo Anvari
Wendy Kweh as Lyn Chee
Sian Breckin as Madeline Hookway
Kerrie Taylor johono
Zaraah Abrahams as DS Emma Ryan
Jade Greyul as Lateesha Kharim
Owen McDonnell as Frank Mercer

Series 3 (2022)
 David Carpenter as Conor Townsend
 Emme Hayes as Maddie Townsend
 Mark Stanley as Warren Pryce
 Vincent Regan as Ray Conlon

Series 4 (2023)
Karl Davies as Carl McGregor
Claire Goose as Jacqui Fischer
Ian Puleston-Davies as Terry McGregor
Kerrie Taylor as Ellen Manning
Tom Taylor as Matt Metcalf
Eloise Thomas as Izzy Metcalf
Joe Armstrong as Dean Metcalf

Episodes

Series 1 (2019)
Detective Sergeant Lisa Armstrong (Morven Christie) is the mother of two children and working for the fictional West Lancashire Police Service as a Family Liaison Officer (FLO). She is called out on the case of two missing teenagers only to find the married stepfather of the twins is someone with whom she had sex in an alley behind a pub on the night the twins disappeared whilst out on a friend's hen do. As an FLO, Armstrong is trained not to become emotionally involved with cases she is working on, but her sexual encounter with Sean (Jonas Armstrong) threatens to compromise the investigation. Although she can prove that he is not responsible for their disappearance, Armstrong deletes the CCTV footage of them having sex rather than coming clean and admitting to the one-night stand and providing Sean with an alibi.

Series 2 (2021)
Lisa's suspension is over but she has been demoted, whilst Med has been promoted. A solicitor is shot on his doorstep. The team investigate. To complicate Lisa's life further, her ex-husband Andy (Joe Absolom) reappears in Morecambe.

Series 3 (2022)
DS Townsend (Marsha Thomason) is immediately thrown into the deep end when a body is found in the bay on her first day in the job. She must get under the skin of a grieving and complicated family if she has any chance of solving the premature death of an aspiring young boxer.

Series 4 (2023)

Production
The series has been labelled the "Northern Broadchurch", or the "New Broadchurch" after a similar British crime drama called Broadchurch starring Olivia Colman and David Tennant. The writer of the series, Daragh Carville, is originally from Northern Ireland, but wanted to set something in where he now lives. 

The series was shot in and around Morecambe, particularly on the beaches and in the Winter Gardens, where writer Daragh Carville stated that the people of Morecambe took quite an interest in the show and were keen to see that they, and their town, were not misrepresented on screen. Other scenes were also shot in Manchester, Whitehaven and Grange-over-Sands.

Reception

Series 1 (2019)
The Daily Telegraph rated the first and second episodes in the series with three stars out of five, and whilst acknowledging the lead character's portrayal, described the series as "Lancashire's riposte to/total rip-off of Broadchurch". The Independent also awarded it three stars out of five, labelling the series as having texture, but that the characterisation of the conundrum faced by DS Armstrong as being "cold". The Guardian was more positive and gave it four stars out of five stating "Suspects and police officers with shared secrets? Check. Information wilfully withheld by the writer? Check. Will you be hooked? Check."

Katrina Williams, writing in the Glasgow Guardian, highlighted the high standard of production amidst the formulaic setting of the crime drama and noted that "I wasn't desperate for the next episode, but the first episode still managed to strike my interest".

Series 2 (2021)
Dominic Maxwell, reviewing for The Times, gave the first episode of the second series four stars out of five commenting that the episode was "a solid, finely crafted detective thriller" and it "could just be the downbeat yet propulsive distraction we need right now". Rachel Sigee, reviewing for the newspaper i, also gave it four stars praising Christie and suggesting "This engrossing first episode scattered enough clues [...] to set up an intriguing thriller". Anita Singh, reviewing for The Daily Telegraph, rated the first episode three stars out of five calling it "a refreshing return for this bracing seaside cop show", while Sean O'Grady for The Independent was more critical commenting that "though the actors put in some commendable performances, they are all lumbered with carelessly constructed, barely two-dimensional characters" and gave it two stars.

References

External links

2019 British television series debuts
2010s British crime drama television series
2010s British mystery television series
2020s British crime drama television series
2020s British mystery television series
British detective television series
English-language television shows
ITV crime dramas
Television series by ITV Studios
Serial drama television series
Television shows set in Lancashire
2020s British drama television series
Family saga television series
ITV television dramas
Television series about dysfunctional families
Television shows about death